"Say It Ain't So" is a 1994 song by Weezer.

Say It Ain't So may also refer to:

Say It Ain't So (album), a 1975 album by Murray Head
"Say It Ain't So", a 2003 song by the Thrills from So Much for the City
"Say It Ain't So" (Degrassi), a 2012 television episode
"Say It Ain't So" (Roseanne), a 1997 television episode

See also
Say it ain't so, Joe (disambiguation)
Say it isn't so (disambiguation)